Amata passalis, the sandalwood defoliator, is a moth of the family Erebidae first described by Johan Christian Fabricius in 1781. It is found in Sri Lanka and India.

Biology
The average life cycle of the species in captivity is 62 days. After mating, the adult female lays about 305 eggs in a lifespan of 3.87 days. It is known to breed all year around and passes through 6-11 generations a year. There are eight larval instars. First and last instar larvae are about 1.97 mm and 29.29 mm in length, respectively. Adults usually emerge within 1 to 2 hours of sunrise. After a day, they are ready for mating. 

It is known mainly as a defoliator of sandalwood (Santalum album) in India. It is also recorded on various alternate food plants, mainly cowpeas, various other pulses, and ornamental plants. The larval stage of Apanteles nepitae can be used as a parasite to control the moth.

Host plants
 Phaseolus vulgaris
 Santalum album
 Trichosanthes anguina
 Vigna unguiculata
 Capsicum annuum
 Brassica caulorapa
 Capsicum annuum
 Phaseolus vulgaris

Gallery

References 

Moths described in 1781
passalis
Moths of Asia
Moths of Sri Lanka